Stepmom is a 1973  Soviet drama film directed by Oleg Bondaryov and starring Tatiana Doronina, and Leonid Nevedomsky.

Doronina was recognized as  Best Actress    by according to Soviet Screen Magazine, and also was awarded the Film Festival in Tehran.

Plot
In Pavel Olevantsev's family  unexpectedly comes the news that his daughter was orphaned by another woman. Pavel  did not know about the existence of the girl, nor could his wife know about it.

It's not easy to decide to take the child to your home. But it is much more difficult to put the girl to her, to give her the joy of childhood and the belief that she is not alone.

But Pavel's wife Shura, in spite of everything, believes that the love and affection that helped her all her life will help her survive this difficult situation.

Cast
 Tatiana Doronina as  Shura Olevantseva
 Leonid Nevedomsky as Pavel Olevantsev
  Lena Kostereva as Sveta, Pavel's illegitimate daughter
 Sasha Dalyky as Yurka 
 Ira Khlopkova as  Alyonka
  as Shura's mother  
 Vladimir Samoilov as Viktor Vikentievich
 Vera Kuznetsova as Yekaterina Alekseevna, teacher

Release
Leader of Soviet film distribution 1973. Occupies by attendance 28th place among  domestic films in  history of Soviet film distribution (59.4 million viewers).

References

External links
   
  Sergey Kudryavtsev's Review

1973 films
Soviet drama films
1970s Russian-language films
Mosfilm films
1973 drama films
Films shot in Russia
Films based on Russian novels